The Ysyk-Ata is a river in Ysyk-Ata District of Chüy Region of Kyrgyzstan. The river rises on the north slopes of  Kyrgyz Ala-Too and flows in north-north-east and north-east directions until confluence with its right tributary Tuyuk. Then the river flows northward entering the Chüy Valley. Ysyk-Ata is a left tributary of the Chu, the major watercourse of the valley. Ysyk-Ata - a balneoclimatic resort is located at the river.

References

Rivers of Kyrgyzstan
Chüy Region
Tian Shan